Kayzie Rogers (also credited as Jamie Peacock) is a retired American voice actress. She is known for her work in anime, commercials, and video games and is known in voicing the characters in the Pokémon universe. She has appeared in titles for 4Kids Entertainment, Central Park Media, DuArt Film and Video, and TAJ Productions.

Career 
Rogers has worked extensively for the Pokémon anime franchise. She has also voiced many characters, including Jessie's Wobbuffet, a role that she had voiced for 16 years, from 2001 to 2017.

Rogers retired from acting in 2017. Her role of Wobbuffet is subsequently replaced by Erica Schroeder.

Filmography

Anime 

Gall Force: Enternal Story - Rumy
Kirby: Right Back at Ya! – Tuff, Lady Like, Hana (Mrs. Mayor), Honey, Vee, Princess Rona
Magical DoReMi – Todd, Miss Shannon 
Now and Then, Here and There – Sara Ringwalt 
One Piece (4Kids Entertainment edit) – Koby, Alvida, Miss Groundhog Day
Ping Pong Club – Kamiya, Softball Player
Pokémon – Max (Season 9), Cyndaquil, Totodile, Taillow, Marshtomp, Corsola, Lotad, Azurill, Marill, Eevee, Swinub, Wobbuffet, Axew, Mime Jr., Mr. Mime
Sonic X - Topaz
Tai Chi Chasers – Elder Komorka 
Tama And Friends – Doozle, Pimmy, Mrs. Buxton, Casey's Mom
Yu-Gi-Oh! Duel Monsters - Duke Girl B

Animation 
Chaotic – Takinom
Funky Cops – Marge
G.I. Joe: Sigma Six – Baroness
Here is Greenwood – Reina Kisaragi (CPM dub)
I Spy – Additional voices
Regal Academy – Grandmother Rapunzel
Teenage Mutant Ninja Turtles – Mrs. Morrison
Winx Club (4Kids Entertainment) – Vanessa

Movies 
Gall Force: Eternal Story – Rumy
Jungle Emperor Leo – Stork
Impy's Island – Peg
Impy's Wonderland – Peg
Pokémon film series – Wobbuffet, Marill, Max
Ten Plus Two (10+2): The Big Secret – Infinity

Web series/shorts 
Disney's World of English – Gymnast, Huey, Dewey and Louie
Zippy and His Friends – Buster, Coco, Joey
Play Along With Me – Bunny
Skyshapers – Sam Scudley, Gredius, Mookie
This Modern World – Hillary Clinton, various voices

Video games 
Bullet Witch – Various voices
Pokémon Channel - Azumarill
Valkryie Profile - Frei

Live action 
Late Night with David Letterman – Remote: "Kayzie Teaches Dave and Barbara a Lesson"
Dr. Atkins New Diet Revolution (Infomercial)- Spokesperson

References

External links 

Living people
American video game actresses
American voice actresses
Place of birth missing (living people)
Year of birth missing (living people)
21st-century American women